The 2013–14 Incarnate Word Cardinals women's basketball team represented the University of the Incarnate Word during the 2013–14 NCAA Division I women's basketball season. The Cardinals were led by first year head coach Kate Henderson, acting as Interim head coach, and played their home games at McDermott Convocation Center. They were new members of the Southland Conference.

2013-14 was year 1 of a 4-year transitional period for Incarnate Word from D2 to D1. During year 1 they only played conference opponents once, with the exception of Abilene Christian.  They were classified as a D2 school for scheduling purposes. Since Abilene Christian was also transitioning, they played them twice. Incarnate Word could not win the regular season basketball title for the 2013–14 season.

In years 2–4 Incarnate Word will be classified as a D1 school for scheduling purposes. They will increase the number of conference games to a regular schedule, and they can win the regular season conference title. However Incarnate Word cannot participate in the conference tourney until the 2017–18 season, at which time they will also be able to enter the NCAA tournament, should they win the conference. Incarnate Word is eligible to participate in the WBI or WNIT should they be invited.

Audio Streaming
All Incarnate Word games were broadcast on KUIW Radio, and they provided streaming of all non-televised home games shown via UIW TV.

Roster

Schedule

|-
!colspan=9| Regular Season

See also
2013–14 Incarnate Word Cardinals men's basketball team

References

Incarnate Word Cardinals women's basketball seasons
Incarnate Word
Incarnate Word Cardinals basketball
Incarnate Word Cardinals basketball